Will of the People may refer to:

General will, a philosophical concept popularized by Jean-Jacques Rousseau
Narodnaya Volya, or People's Will, the name of a number of populist movements in the Russian Empire
People's Will (parliamentary group), Ukrainian parliamentary faction established in 2014
Will of the People (album), the ninth studio album by English rock band Muse
"Will of the People" (song), from the album
Will of the People World Tour, concert tour promoting the album
"Will of the People", song by Tim Pool